Brad Roach (born March 4, 1985) is a former American and Canadian football quarterback. He was signed by the Baltimore Ravens as an undrafted free agent in 2008. He played college football at Catawba.

Roach has also been a member of the Montreal Alouettes.

References

External links
Montreal Alouettes bio

1985 births
Living people
People from Williamston, North Carolina
American football quarterbacks
American players of Canadian football
Canadian football quarterbacks
Catawba Indians football players
Baltimore Ravens players
Mahoning Valley Thunder players
Montreal Alouettes players